Haler is a small village near Tehsil Jaisinghpur. It has an average elevation of 558 metres (1,831 feet). Haler is a village of Himachal Pradesh, under Tehshil Jaisinghpur, Kangra district, India. It is located between Dalu village and Thanpal village. It is situated on the Bank of River Beas. A famous Nag Naguli temple is 4 km from haler, due to this, many pilgrim arrive there. And here is also a Sita ram temple that is situated in the shore of Haler Khad. In Haler there is govt school that provides education up to 10th class.

Haler Pin Code is 176 091 and People of Haler Village use Hindi Language for communication.

Village profile
As of Census of India 2001

Area details
Area of village (in hectares) - 126
Number of households - 146
Population data based on 2001 census
Total population - Persons - 679
Total population - Males - 306
Total population - Females - 373
Scheduled castes population - Persons -	104
Scheduled castes population - Males -	48
Scheduled castes population - Females -	56
Education facilities
Number of primary schools -	1
Number of middle schools -	1
College available within range -	Within 5 km
Medical facilities
Allopathic hospitals available within range -	More than 10 km
Maternity and child welfare centre available within range -	Within 5 km
Primary health centre available within range -	Within 5 km
Number of primary health sub centre - 	1
Post, telegraph and telephone facilities
Number of post office -	1
Number of telephone connections -	14
Banking facilities
Commercial bank available within range -	Within 5 km
Land use (Two decimal) in hectares
Number of forest land -	2
Number of government canal -	0
Number of private canal -	22.00
Total irrigated area -	22.00
Unirrigated area -	22.00
Culturable waste (including gauchar and groves) -	25.00
Area not available for cultivation -	55.00

References

Villages in Kangra district